The Goren Trophy (formerly the Herman Trophy) is awarded to the player who wins the greatest number of masterpoints at the fall American Contract Bridge League (ACBL) North American Bridge Championship (NABC).

History

The Herman Trophy was donated in 1951 by Sally Lipton, formerly Mrs. Lou Herman, in memory of  Lou Herman (1908–1950), a Houston jeweler who was ACBL Life Master #218. Mrs. Lipton was a member of the ACBL office staff in New York and an ACBL tournament director. In 2008, the trophy was renamed the Goren Trophy to honor one of the game's greatest contributors, Charles Goren.

Herman Trophy winners

Boldface numerals represent a record-breaking number of masterpoints.

Goren Trophy winners
Boldface numerals represent a record-breaking number of masterpoints.

See also
Mott-Smith Trophy
Fishbein Trophy

References

External links
NABC results at the ACBL official website

+